John Cairns (1859 - 23 May 1923) was Labour MP for Morpeth from the 1918 general election until his death, which led to the 1923 Morpeth by-election.

Born at Choppington in Northumberland, Cairns worked as a coal miner and became active in the Northumberland Miners' Association.  He was elected as the full-time financial secretary of the union, also serving as secretary of the Joint Committee in the Northumberland Coal Trade, and President of the Northumberland Aged Mine Workers' Homes Association.

In his spare time, Cairns was active in the Primitive Methodist movement, and wrote books including Money and Economics of Industry.

Cairns was a supporter of the Labour Party, for which he was elected in Morpeth in 1918.  He served until his death, in 1923.

References

People from Choppington
1859 births
1923 deaths
Labour Party (UK) MPs for English constituencies
Miners' Federation of Great Britain-sponsored MPs
UK MPs 1918–1922
UK MPs 1922–1923